Phasmahyla jandaia is a species of frog in the subfamily Phyllomedusinae. It is endemic to Brazil, where its natural habitats are subtropical or tropical moist montane forests, moist savanna, and rivers. It is threatened by habitat loss.

References

Phasmahyla
Endemic fauna of Brazil
Amphibians described in 1978
Taxonomy articles created by Polbot